Dato' Tan Yee Khan  (born 24 September 1940) is a former Malaysian badminton player who represented his country in badminton events around the world during the 1960s.

Career 
Though capable of high level singles (he won Japan's "World Invitational" tourney in 1964 and ousted Erland Kops in the first round of the 1966 All Englands), Yee Khan was primarily a doubles player who won numerous  major international titles in partnership with Ng Boon Bee. Powerfully built and substantially bigger than most Asian players of his day, he was reputed to be the hardest smasher in the game. He won the coveted All-England men's doubles title with Boon Bee consecutively in 1965 and 1966. In 1967 he was a member of Malaysia's world champion Thomas Cup (men's international) team. Plagued by back problems he retired from badminton competition in 1969 but soon became one of Malaysia's leading golfers. He was elected to the World Badminton Hall of Fame in 1998.

He now runs an island resort on the west coast of Peninsular Malaysia, on the island of Pangkor called Sea View Hotel & Holiday Resort.

Achievements

Asian Games 
Men's doubles

Asian Championships 
Men's singles

Men's doubles

Mixed doubles

Southeast Asian Peninsular Games 
Men's doubles

Mixed doubles

Commonwealth Games 
Men's doubles

International tournaments 
Men's doubles

Mixed doubles

Honours 
  :
 Member of the Order of the Defender of the Realm (A.M.N.) (1972)
  :
 Knight Commander of the Order of the Perak State Crown (D.P.M.P.) (2007) - Dato'

References  

1940 births
Living people
Malaysian male badminton players
Asian Games medalists in badminton
Badminton players at the 1966 Asian Games
Badminton players at the 1962 Asian Games
Asian Games gold medalists for Malaysia
Asian Games silver medalists for Malaysia
Asian Games bronze medalists for Malaysia
Commonwealth Games medallists in badminton
Commonwealth Games silver medallists for Malaysia
Badminton players at the 1966 British Empire and Commonwealth Games
Medalists at the 1962 Asian Games
Medalists at the 1966 Asian Games
Southeast Asian Games medalists in badminton
Southeast Asian Games gold medalists for Malaysia
Members of the Order of the Defender of the Realm
Competitors at the 1961 Southeast Asian Peninsular Games
People from Ipoh
Malaysian sportspeople of Chinese descent
Medallists at the 1966 British Empire and Commonwealth Games